Christian Perthaler (born July 21, 1968 in Innsbruck, Austria) is an Austrian former ice hockey right winger.

Perthaler began his career with his hometown team Innsbrucker EV, where he spent four seasons.  He moved to EK Zell am See for one season before joining Klagenfurt AC, spending three seasons with them.  He spent one season with VEU Feldkirch before rejoining Klagenfurt.  In 2001, he joined EHC Black Wings Linz and remained with the team until his retirement in 2008 at the age of 40.  He also represented Austria at the 1998 Winter Olympics and the 2002 Winter Olympics.

References

External links

1968 births
Austrian ice hockey right wingers
EHC Black Wings Linz players
EK Zell am See players
Ice hockey players at the 1998 Winter Olympics
Ice hockey players at the 2002 Winter Olympics
Innsbrucker EV players
EC KAC players
Living people
Olympic ice hockey players of Austria
Sportspeople from Innsbruck
VEU Feldkirch players